The green-legged partridge (Tropicoperdix chloropus), also known as the scaly-breasted partridge or green-legged hill-partridge, is a bird species in the family Phasianidae. It is found in forest in Indochina, ranging slightly into southernmost China (Yunnan). The Vietnam partridge is now usually considered a subspecies.

References

Further reading

green-legged partridge
Birds of Cambodia
Birds of Laos
Birds of Thailand
Birds of Vietnam
Birds of Indochina
green-legged partridge
green-legged partridge
Taxonomy articles created by Polbot